Chak No 521/E.B is a village in Burewala, District Vehari, South Punjab, Pakistan. 

Social Media Pages: Facebook , Facbook Group (Village Community), Instagram , Twitter 

Number of Schools: 3 

School Names:  

1: Govt Middle School for Boys 521/E.B 

2: Govt Primary School for Girls 521/E.B 

3: The TCF School  

Number of Houses: 350

References
https://www.nation.com.pk/27-Apr-2022/dacoits-loot-cash-valuables-from-citizens Nation,com.pk

Villages in Vehari District